Peucetius may refer to:

 Peucetius (mythology), a son of Lycaon of Arcadia
 Streptomyces peucetius, a bacterium species